Robyn Green is an Australian gospel singer. She released her first album, Here's The Answer, in 1986. She is an influential Indigenous Australian Pentecostal worship leader.

Discography
He is the Answer (1986)
Good News (1988)
Shine On (1992)
Sweet Surrender (2000)
Touched by your Love
Timeless Land (2006)
I Will Arise (2008)
Only You (2015)

References

External links
Official website
Robyn Green on Google Play

Indigenous Australian musicians
Living people
Year of birth missing (living people)